Cingula trifasciata is a species of minute sea snail, a marine gastropod mollusk or micromollusk in the family Rissoidae.

Description
The length of an adult shell varies between 3 mm and 5 mm.

Distribution
This species occurs in the Atlantic Ocean from Norway to the Azores; in the Mediterranean Sea.

References

 Ponder W. F. (1985). A review of the Genera of the Rissoidae (Mollusca: Mesogastropoda: Rissoacea). Records of the Australian Museum supplement 4: 1-221
 Little, C.; Morritt, D.; Seaward, D.R.; Williams, G.A. (1989). Distribution of intertidal molluscs in lagoonal shingle (The Fleet, Dorset, U.K.). J. Conch., Lond. 33: 225-232
 Gofas, S.; Le Renard, J.; Bouchet, P. (2001). Mollusca, in: Costello, M.J. et al. (Ed.) (2001). European register of marine species: a check-list of the marine species in Europe and a bibliography of guides to their identification. Collection Patrimoines Naturels, 50: pp. 180–213

External links
 

Rissoidae
Gastropods described in 1800